John Wesley Langley (January 14, 1868 – January 17, 1932) was a U.S. Representative from Kentucky, husband of Katherine Gudger Langley.

Born in Floyd County, Kentucky, Langley attended the common schools and then taught school for three years.  He attended the law department of the National, Georgetown, and Columbian (now George Washington) Universities in Washington, D.C., for an aggregate period of eight years.

He was Examiner in the Pension Office and a member of the Board of Pension Appeals, Law Clerk in the General Land Office, and from 1899 to 1907, he was Disbursing and Appointment Clerk of the Census Office.  He served in the State House of Representatives from 1886 to 1890.

Langley was elected on March 4, 1907, as a Republican to the Sixtieth and to the nine succeeding Congresses where he became known as "Pork Barrel John."  He served as chairman of the Committee on Public Buildings and Grounds (Sixty-sixth through Sixty-eighth Congresses).

He resigned on January 11, 1926, after being convicted of illegally selling alcohol. Langley had deposited $115,000 in his bank account over a three-year period despite earning only $7,500 a year as a congressman. He had arranged for "medicinal" alcohol to be released to New York-based bootleggers during prohibition. He also tried to bribe a Prohibition officer.

His wife Katherine, then ran for his seat and won in the next election, declaring that her husband had been the victim of a conspiracy and resolving to clear his name.  She also won the next election. He was paroled from the Atlanta Penitentiary in 1929, and with Katherine's intervention, President Calvin Coolidge granted John Langley a pardon on December 20, 1928. He sent out a Christmas message to his wife's constituents and a week later declared his intention to run for office (even though the President had stipulated his clemency was predicated on never running for office again). He self-published a book They Tried to Crucify Me (1929) hoping to gain back his political clout.

He resumed the practice of law in Pikeville, Kentucky, where he remained in good favor with his former constituents. Polly V. Hall, a Republican who was 98 years old in 1987 when she was interviewed, could remember his name (though not his wife's), and she stated emphatically that "... he was a good man ... never heard nothing bad said about him."

John Langley died on January 17, 1932, from pneumonia. He was interred in Floyd County, Kentucky.

See also
List of American federal politicians convicted of crimes
List of federal political scandals in the United States

References

Bibliography
 
 
 

|-

1868 births
1932 deaths
Kentucky lawyers
Kentucky politicians convicted of crimes
Republican Party members of the Kentucky House of Representatives
People from Floyd County, Kentucky
Republican Party members of the United States House of Representatives from Kentucky
Spouses of Kentucky politicians
United States Department of the Interior officials